Yuki Bhambri and Adrián Menéndez-Maceiras were the defending champions but chose not to participate.

Enrique López-Pérez and Jeevan Nedunchezhiyan won the title after defeating Aleksandre Metreveli and Dmitry Popko 6–1, 6–4 in the final.

Seeds

Draw

References

External links
 Main draw

Karshi Challenger - Doubles